Santa Maria del Camí is a municipality in the Comarca of Raiguer on Majorca, one of the Balearic Islands, Spain.  It is located about 17km north east of the island's capital, Palma de Mallorca.

References

Municipalities in Mallorca
Populated places in Mallorca